The Secretary of State of Ohio is an elected statewide official in the State of Ohio.  The Secretary of state is responsible for overseeing elections in the state; registering business entities (corporations, etc.) and granting them the authority to do business within the state; registering secured transactions; and granting access to public documents.

From 1803 to 1851, the Ohio Secretary of State was elected by the Ohio General Assembly to a three-year term.  The 1851 Ohio Constitution made the office elective, with a two-year term.  In 1954, the office's term was extended to four years.  The Secretary of State is elected in even-numbered, off cycle years, (no Presidential elections), after partisan primary elections.

List of Ohio secretaries of state

See also

Election Results, Ohio Secretary of State
Ohio Attorney General

References

External links

Ohio Secretary of State

1803 establishments in Ohio